Zarghan (also Romanized as Zarghān; also known as Zālenjeh, Zalinja, Zalīnjeh, Zaragan, Zaraqān, and Zarqān) is a village in Bonab Rural District, in the Central District of Marand County, East Azerbaijan Province, Iran. At the 2006 census, its population was 801, in 206 families.

References 

Populated places in Marand County